The BBC (British Broadcasting Corporation) Indian Sportswoman of the Year Award (abbreviated as BBC ISWOTY) is an initiative first announced in December 2019 by BBC Hindi to celebrate and honour sportswomen from India who have excelled in their chosen field of competition. The first edition of the awards took place in March 2020 where badminton star P. V. Sindhu was presented with the inaugural honour. The latest edition of the awards took place in March 2023 with Mirabai Chanu awarded the accolade for the second year in a row.

Nomination and selection procedure
A jury of sports journalists, experts and BBC editors vote on a long-list of fifty Indian sportswomen nominated on the basis of their performance in a 12 month period preceding the year of the award. The five Indian sportswomen who receive the most votes proceed to a public vote. The public can cast their votes via various BBC Indian language websites on which the award is promoted and the BBC Sport website. The shortlisted nominee with the highest number of public votes is declared winner and awarded the title of "BBC Indian Sportswoman of the Year". Only the headline award is selected on the basis of a public vote, with the other three awards being decided by the jury alone.

First edition 

The ISWOTY award was first instituted in 2020. The shortlisted nominees, announced in early February 2020, who proceeded to the public vote were:

 Dutee Chand, sprinter and national 100m champion
 Manasi Joshi, para-badminton world champion 
 Mary Kom, Olympic boxer
 Vinesh Phogat, freestyle wrestler 
 P. V. Sindhu, badminton world champion

On 8 March 2020, to coincide with International Women’s Day, the BBC announced P. V. Sindhu as Indian Sportswoman of the Year 2019 at a ceremony held in Delhi. Minister of Youth Affairs and Sports (India) Kiren Rijiju was present as the guest of honour at the event. As a part of the program, retired track and field athlete P. T. Usha, was awarded the Lifetime Achievement Award.

Second edition
The BBC announced its second edition of ISWOTY on 18 January 2021. Nominees for the second edition of the award were revealed on 8 February that same year. The shortlisted nominees who proceeded to the public vote were: 

 Rani Rampal, Indian field hockey team captain
 Vinesh Phogat, freestyle wrestler
 Manu Bhaker, airgun shooter
 Koneru Humpy, world rapid chess champion
 Dutee Chand, sprinter 

In a virtual ceremony held on 8 March 2021, the BBC named Koneru Humpy as Indian Sportswoman of the Year 2020. A lifetime achievement award was awarded to former long-jumper and Khel Ratna awardee Anju Bobby George. This edition also marked the introduction of the Emerging Sportswoman of the Year Award which was presented by cricketer Ben Stokes to Manu Bhaker who had also been on the shortlist for the main award. 

A sports edit-a-thon was organised as part of the ISWOTY 2021, where journalism students from across the country created/improved articles on Indian sportswomen in various Indic language Wikipedias.

Third edition
The BBC announced the third edition of ISWOTY on 17 January 2022. The nominations for the third edition of the award were announced on 8 February for five Indian sportswomen who had an outstanding calendar year, from 1 October 2020 to 30 September 2021. The shortlisted nominees who proceeded to the public vote were:

 Aditi Ashok, golfer
 Lovlina Borgohain, boxer
 Mirabai Chanu, weightlifter
 Avani Lekhara, paralympic gold medal winning shooter 
 P. V. Sindhu, badminton player

At the awards ceremony held on 28 March 2022, Mirabai Chanu was announced as the BBC Indian Sportswoman of the Year 2021, with cricketer Shafali Verma given the accolade of Emerging Sportswoman of the Year. The Lifetime Achievement Award was presented to former weightlifter and Padma Shri recipient Karnam Malleshwari.

Fourth edition 
The nominations for the fourth edition of the award were announced on 6 February 2023 for five Indian sportswomen who had an outstanding calendar year, from 1 October 2021 to 30 September 2022. The shortlisted nominees who proceeded to the public vote were:

 Sakshee Malikkh, Freestyle wrestler 
 Nikhat Zareen, boxer
 Vinesh Phogat, freestyle wrestler,
 Mirabai Chanu, weightlifter
 P. V. Sindhu, badminton player
At the awards ceremony held on 5 March 2023 at the Taj Palace Hotel in New Delhi, Mirabai Chanu was announced as the BBC Indian Sportswoman of the Year for the second year in a row, with boxer Nitu Ghangas given the accolade of Emerging Sportswoman of the Year. The Lifetime Achievement Award was presented to former hockey player / coach and Dronacharya Award recipient Pritam Rani Siwach. This edition marked the introduction of the Indian Para Sportswoman for the Year Award which was presented to Bhavina Patel for her achievements in Table Tennis.

India's Commonwealth gold medal-winning lawn bowls team, composed of Lovely Choubey, Rupa Rani Tirkey, Pinki Singh and Nayanmoni Saikia were also honoured at the ceremony, receiving a special trophy for their historic achievement. Bhagwani Devi and Rambai received Changemaker of the Year awards.

In attendance at the ceremony were Ashok Gehlot, Chief Minister of Rajasthan, Dilip Tirkey, former captain of the India men's national hockey team and current President of Hockey India, Olympic boxing champion Vijender Singh and India's top-ranked table tennis player Manika Batra.

Winners

Multiple nominations and wins

See also
BBC Sports Personality of the Year

References

External links
 

Indian sports trophies and awards
Awards established in 2020
2020 establishments in India
BBC awards